Madhuca multinervia is a tree in the family Sapotaceae, native to Borneo. The specific epithet  means "many-veined", referring to the leaves.

Description
The bark is pale brown, mottled grey. Its Inflorescences bear up to 10 flowers.

Distribution and habitat
Madhuca multinervia is endemic to Borneo, where it is confined to Sabah.

Conservation
Madhuca multinervia has been assessed as endangered on the IUCN Red List. It is primarily threatened by conversion of land in its habitat for palm oil plantations. It is also threatened by harvesting for its timber. The species does occur in some protected areas.

References

multinervia
Endemic flora of Borneo
Flora of Sabah
Plants described in 2001